This is a list of events in Scottish television from 1991.

Events

January
No events.

February
18 February – BBC 1 Scotland is rebranded as BBC Scotland on 1 and BBC 2 Scotland as BBC Scotland on 2.

March to August
No events.

September
1 September – 30th anniversary of Border Television.
30 September – 30th anniversary of Grampian Television.

October
 October – Scottish rebrands its overnight service as Scottish Night Time, and removed the overnight in-vision continuity. 
16 October – The ITC announces that Grampian, Scottish and Border have retained their ITV franchises. Only Grampian's franchise had attracted rival bidders. The other two applicants for the north east Scotland franchise both submitted higher cash bids but both failed to meet the quality threshold.

November
No events.

December
31 December – The BBC airs the first edition of Hogmanay Live, an annual programme that rings in the New Year.

Unknown
BBC Scotland airs the series Restless Nation which explores the history of Scottish self-government.

Debuts

BBC
Unknown – Restless Nation (1991)
31 December – Hogmanay Live (1991–present)

Television series
Scotsport (1957–2008)
Reporting Scotland (1968–1983; 1984–present)
Top Club (1971–1998)
Scotland Today (1972–2009)
Sportscene (1975–present)
The Beechgrove Garden (1978–present)
Grampian Today (1980–2009)
Take the High Road (1980–2003)
Taggart (1983–2010)
James the Cat (1984–1992)
Crossfire (1984–2004)
Wheel of Fortune (1988–2001)
Fun House (1989–1999)
Win, Lose or Draw (1990–2004)

Ending this year
10 November – Naked Video (1986–1991)
City Lights (1984–1991)

See also
1991 in Scotland

References

 
Television in Scotland by year
1990s in Scottish television